{{Infobox UK place
| country                          = Scotland
| official_name                    = Doll
| scots_name                       =
| gaelic_name                      = An Dail
| population                       = 
| static_image                     = Beach south of Brora - geograph.org.uk - 129075.jpg
| static_image_caption             = Looking south from Brora towards Doll.
| static_image_width               = 
| os_grid_reference                = NC888029
| map_type                         = Sutherland
| coordinates                      = 
| unitary_scotland                 = Highland
| lieutenancy_scotland             = 
| constituency_westminster         = 
| constituency_scottish_parliament = 
| post_town                        = Brora
| postcode_district                = KW9 6
| postcode_area                    = KW| dial_code                        =  
}}
The main road artery of the A9 has bypassed Doll to the south.

 Etymology 
The name Doll may be of Brittonic origin and derived from dol meaning "haugh, meadow" (c.f. Welsh dôl; compare Dull).

Settlements
Doll, in the Parish of Clyne, is a scattered crofting township, located south of the Brora River with Brora located at the other side river to the northeast. Doll consists of a large flat plain, in a triangular shape, with the longest edge following the course of the river. To the southwest lies the village of Golspie. John Bartholomew described the hamlet as:Doll, hamlet with school, Clyne par., SE. Sutherlandshire, 2 miles W. of Brora.''

References

Populated places in Sutherland